Mary Herbert, Countess of Pembroke ( Sidney, 27 October 1561 – 25 September 1621) was among the first Englishwomen to gain notice for her poetry and her literary patronage. By the age of 39, she was listed with her brother Philip Sidney and with Edmund Spenser and William Shakespeare among the notable authors of the day in John Bodenham's verse miscellany Belvidere. Her play Antonius is widely seen as reviving interest in soliloquy based on classical models and as a likely source of Samuel Daniel's closet drama Cleopatra (1594) and of Shakespeare's Antony and Cleopatra (1607). She was also known for translating Petrarch's "Triumph of Death", for the poetry anthology Triumphs, and above all for a lyrical, metrical translation of the Psalms.

Biography

Early life
Mary Sidney was born on 27 October 1561 at Tickenhill Palace in the parish of Bewdley, Worcestershire. She was one of the seven children – three sons and four daughters – of Sir Henry Sidney and wife Mary Dudley. Their eldest son was Sir Philip Sidney (1554–1586), and their second son Robert Sidney (1563–1626), who later became Earl of Leicester. As a child, she spent much time at court where her mother was a gentlewoman of the Privy Chamber and a close confidante of Queen Elizabeth I. Like her brother Philip, she received a humanist education which included music, needlework, and Latin, French and Italian. After the death of Sidney's youngest sister, Ambrosia, in 1575, the Queen requested that Mary return to court to join the royal entourage.

Marriage and children

In 1577, Mary Sidney married Henry Herbert, 2nd Earl of Pembroke (1538–1601), a close ally of the family. The marriage was arranged by her father in concert with her uncle, Robert Dudley, Earl of Leicester. After her marriage, Mary became responsible with her husband for the management of a number of estates which he owned including Ramsbury, Ivychurch, Wilton House, and Baynard's Castle in London, where it is known that they entertained Queen Elizabeth to dinner. She had four children by her husband: 
William Herbert, 3rd Earl of Pembroke (1580–1630), was the eldest son and heir.
Katherine Herbert (1581–1584) died as an infant.
Anne Herbert (born 1583 – after 1603) was thought also to have been a writer and a storyteller.
Philip Herbert, 4th Earl of Pembroke (1584–1650), succeeded his brother in 1630. Philip and his older brother William were the "incomparable pair of brethren" to whom the First Folio of Shakespeare's collected works was dedicated in 1623.

Mary Sidney was an aunt to the poet Mary Wroth, daughter of her brother Robert.

Later life
The death of Sidney's husband in 1601 left her with less financial support than she might have expected, though views on its adequacy vary; at the time the majority of an estate was left to the eldest son.

In addition to the arts, Sidney had a range of interests. She had a chemistry laboratory at Wilton House, where she developed medicines and invisible ink. From 1609 to 1615, Mary Sidney probably spent most of her time at Crosby Hall in London.

She travelled with her doctor, Martin Lister, to Spa, Belgium in 1616. Dudley Carleton met her in the company of Helene de Melun, "Countess of Berlaymont", wife of Florent de Berlaymont the governor of Luxembourg. The two women amused themselves with pistol shooting. Sir John Throckmorton heard she went on to Amiens. There is conjecture that she married Lister, but no evidence of this.

She died of smallpox on 25 September 1621, aged 59, at her townhouse in Aldersgate Street in London, shortly after King James I had visited her at the newly completed Houghton House in Bedfordshire. After a grand funeral in St Paul's Cathedral, her body was buried in Salisbury Cathedral, next to that of her late husband in the Herbert family vault, under the steps leading to the choir stalls, where the mural monument still stands.

Literary career

Wilton House

Mary Sidney turned Wilton House into a "paradise for poets", known as the "Wilton Circle," a salon-type literary group sustained by her hospitality, which included Edmund Spenser, Samuel Daniel, Michael Drayton, Ben Jonson, and Sir John Davies. John Aubrey wrote, "Wilton House was like a college, there were so many learned and ingenious persons. She was the greatest patroness of wit and learning of any lady in her time." Sidney received more dedications than any other woman of non-royal status. By some accounts, King James I visited Wilton on his way to his coronation in 1603 and stayed again at Wilton following the coronation to avoid the plague. She was regarded as a muse by Daniel in his sonnet cycle "Delia", an anagram for ideal.

Her brother, Philip Sidney, wrote much of his Arcadia in her presence, at Wilton House. He also probably began preparing his English lyric version of the Book of Psalms at Wilton as well.

Sidney psalter
Philip Sidney had completed translating 43 of the 150 Psalms at the time of his death on a military campaign against the Spanish in the Netherlands in 1586. She finished his translation, composing Psalms 44 through to 150 in a dazzling array of verse forms, using the 1560 Geneva Bible and commentaries by John Calvin and Theodore Beza. Hallett Smith has called the psalter a "School of English Versification" , of 171 poems (Psalm 119 is a gathering of 22 separate ones). A copy of the completed psalter was prepared for Queen Elizabeth I in 1599, in anticipation of a royal visit to Wilton, but Elizabeth cancelled her planned visit. This work is usually referred to as The Sidney Psalms or The Sidney-Pembroke Psalter and regarded as a major influence on the development of English religious lyric poetry in the late 16th and early 17th centuries. John Donne wrote a poem celebrating the verse psalter and claiming he could "scarce" call the English Church reformed until its psalter had been modelled after the poetic transcriptions of Philip Sidney and Mary Herbert.

Although the psalms were not printed in her lifetime, they were extensively distributed in manuscript. There are 17 manuscripts extant today. A later engraving of Herbert shows her holding them. Her literary influence can be seen in literary patronage, in publishing her brother's works and in her own verse forms, dramas, and translations. Contemporary poets who commended Herbert's psalms include Samuel Daniel, Sir John Davies, John Donne, Michael Drayton, Sir John Harington, Ben Jonson, Emilia Lanier and Thomas Moffet. The importance of these is evident in the devotional lyrics of Barnabe Barnes, Nicholas Breton, Henry Constable, Francis Davison, Giles Fletcher, and Abraham Fraunce. Their influence on the later religious poetry of Donne, George Herbert, Henry Vaughan, and John Milton has been critically recognized since Louis Martz placed it at the start of a developing tradition of 17th-century devotional lyricism.

Sidney was instrumental in bringing her brother's An Apology for Poetry or Defence of Poesy into print. She circulated the Sidney–Pembroke Psalter in manuscript at about the same time. This suggests a common purpose in their design. Both argued, in formally different ways, for the ethical recuperation of poetry as an instrument for moral instruction — particularly religious instruction. Sidney also took on editing and publishing her brother's Arcadia, which he claimed to have written in her presence as The Countesse of Pembroke's Arcadia.

Other works
Sydney's closet drama Antonius is a translation of a French play, Marc-Antoine (1578) by Robert Garnier. Mary is known to have translated two other works: A Discourse of Life and Death by Philippe de Mornay, published with Antonius in 1592, and Petrarch's The Triumph of Death, circulated in manuscript. Her original poems include the pastoral "A Dialogue betweene Two Shepheards, Thenot and Piers, in praise of Astrea," and two dedicatory addresses, one to Elizabeth I and one to her own brother Philip, contained in the Tixall manuscript copy of her verse psalter. An elegy for Philip, "The dolefull lay of Clorinda", was published in Colin Clouts Come Home Againe (1595) and attributed to Spenser and to Mary Herbert, but Pamela Coren attributes it to Spenser, though also saying that Mary's poetic reputation does not suffer from loss of the attribution.

By at least 1591, the Pembrokes were providing patronage to a playing company, Pembroke's Men, one of the early companies to perform works of Shakespeare. According to one account, Shakespeare's company "The King's Men" performed at Wilton at this time.

June and Paul Schlueter published an article in The Times Literary Supplement of 23 July 2010 describing a manuscript of newly discovered works by Mary Sidney Herbert.

Her poetic epitaph, ascribed to Ben Jonson but more likely to have been written in an earlier form by the poets William Browne and her son William, summarizes how she was regarded in her own day:
Underneath this sable hearse,
Lies the subject of all verse,
Sidney's sister, Pembroke's mother.
Death, ere thou hast slain another
Fair and learned and good as she,
Time shall throw a dart at thee.

Her literary talents and aforementioned family connections to Shakespeare has caused her to be nominated as one of the many claimants named as the true author of the works of William Shakespeare in the Shakespeare authorship question.

In popular culture
Mary Sidney appears as a character in Deborah Harkness's novel "Shadow of Night", which is the second instalment of her "All Souls" trilogy. Sidney is portrayed by Amanda Hale in the second season of the television adaptation of the book.

Ancestry

Related pages
Philip Sidney
Isabella Whitney
Sidney Psalms
Edmund Spenser
Samuel Daniel

Notes

References

Sources

Further reading

External links

"The Works of Mary (Sidney) Herbert" (for some of the original texts and Psalms), luminarium.org; accessed 27 March 2014.
Project Continua: Biography of Mary Sidney 

1561 births
1621 deaths
16th-century English nobility
16th-century English poets
16th-century English women writers
16th-century English writers
17th-century English poets
17th-century English women writers
17th-century English writers
Deaths from smallpox
Pembroke, Mary Sidney
English women poets
Mary
Infectious disease deaths in England
People from Bewdley
People from Houghton Conquest
Renaissance writers
Mary
Translators of the Bible into English
Translators to English
Burials at Salisbury Cathedral
Female Bible Translators
Wives of knights